Anthony Nigel Stanley Freeling (born 6 August 1956) is a British management consultant, marketing expert, university administrator, and academic. Since October 2022, he has been Acting Vice-Chancellor of the University of Cambridge. He was President of Hughes Hall, Cambridge from 2014 to 2022.

Early life and education
Freeling was born in London in 1956, the son of Dr Paul and Shirley Freeling. He was educated at Haberdashers' Aske's School, Elstree, and St John's College, Cambridge, where he graduated with a first-class BA degree in Maths in 1978, an MPhil in Control Engineering and Operational Research in 1980 and a PhD in Management Studies in 1985. In 2022 he was made an Honorary Fellow of St John's College.

Career
Before moving to academia, Freeling worked as a director of McKinsey & Company and was a member of the Governing Body of the Open University.

University of Cambridge
From 2008 to 2014, Freeling was a City Fellow of Hughes Hall, Cambridge; this is a type of fellowship held by those active in the City of London or other areas of business rather than full-time academics. In December 2013, he was elected President of Hughes Hall, and he took up the appointment on 1 October 2014, for a period of eight years. His term as master ended in July 2022.

In May 2022, it was announced that Freeling was to become Acting Vice-Chancellor of the University of Cambridge. He took up the post on 1 October 2022 and will hold the appointment for nine months: he is the first acting vice-chancellor in the history of the university.

Personal life
In 1989, Freeling married the then Laurel Claire Powers. Together they have two daughters.

Works
Agile Marketing (2011)

References

 

 
 
 
 
 

Living people
British management consultants
British marketing people
Presidents of Hughes Hall, Cambridge
Alumni of St John's College, Cambridge
1956 births
Vice-Chancellors of the University of Cambridge